Jalali is a small town situated in Almora district, in the state of Uttarakhand in India. It is situated on the Ranikhet-Masi road,  from Ranikhet.

Demographics

 Total population:   359 
 Sex ratio:   1362 females per 1000 males 
 Literacy rate:   80.18%

Education

 G.I.C. Jalali is a government intermediate college Hindi medium. 
 Saraswati Shishu Mandir Jalali is a school run by the Rashtriya Swayam Sevak Sangh (RSS).

Cities and towns in Almora district